is a Japanese anime series made by Nippon Animation in 1979. It is based on the 1922 children's book Bannertail by Ernest Thompson Seton. It ran for a total of 26 episodes and told the story of Banner, a young orphaned squirrel raised by a kindly mother cat, and his adventures in the forest. It is also known by its German version, entitled Puschel, das Eichhorn. In the Arab and Persian worlds, where the anime succeeded in attracting young viewers and gained much popularity, it is known as Sanjab (سنجاب) or Sanajeb-el Gaaba (سناجب الغابة). It was also popular in Spain and Latin America under the name Banner & Flappy, it was also popular in Portugal, under the name Bana & Flapi.

Characters
 Banner (Noriko Tsukase, Robert Axelrod (English)) is the protagonist of the series; a young squirrel who wears a bell around his neck. Orphaned as a baby, he was taken in and raised by a cat. A fire in the first episode separates him from his adopted mother and he flees to the forest where he befriends the wild squirrels and learns to survive. His feline upbringing means he is braver and tougher than other squirrels. Rather than flee from predators he will often attack them head on, especially to save his friends.
 Sue (Keiko Yokozawa) is a young female squirrel with a flower in her hair. She is attracted to Banner due to his innocence and more than any of the others she is helpful in teaching him how to survive in the wild. The two eventually marry and have children in the series' final episode.
 Grandfather (Kazuomi Ikeda) is Sue's grandfather and the oldest and wisest of the squirrels. He presides over festivals and ceremonies and makes all of the important decisions. He is very calm and thoughtful.
 Clay (Masako Sugaya) is a squirrel much younger than Banner. He is the first of the wild squirrels Banner meets, when Banner saves him from a fox. He and Banner very quickly become best friends.
 Lori (Hiroko Maruyama) is Clay's overprotective mother. She is constantly fearful for her child's safety, and like the others is initially distrustful of Banner until he saves both her and Clay from a farmer.
 Gocha and Radōru (Shigeru Chiba and Kaneta Kimotsuki) are the two comic relief friends of Banner. They are initially antagonistic and distrustful of Banner (Radōru more than Gocha) but eventually become close friends with him after Banner rescues Radōru from a snapping turtle.
 Akācho (Takeshi Aono) is a squirrel with long pointed ears who pines for Sue and develops a rivalry with Banner for her hand in marriage. He is very cunning, underhanded and devious, not to mention arrogant.
 Uncle Owl (Ichirō Nagai) is an owl who is the first denizen of the forest who Banner encounters. Initially he intends to eat him, but Banner, thinking himself a cat, fights back rather than flee, earning Owl's respect and eventually his friendship. When some hunters enter the forest, Owl is killed by a bullet intended for Banner.
 Mother Cat (Ikuko Tani) is Banner's adopted mother. She raised him as her own after he was found alone as a baby by the farmer's son. She is the one who gave Banner the bell he wears at all times. She and Banner were separated in a fire in the first episode, but are eventually reunited.
 Other characters include a chipmunk and a pair of rats named Non and Nen.

Episode list

References

External links
 

1979 anime television series debuts
Nippon Animation
Television shows based on children's books
Television shows based on American novels
Animated television series about squirrels
TV Asahi original programming
Ernest Thompson Seton